Sicarius is a genus of recluse spiders that is potentially medically significant to humans. It is one of three genera in its family, all venomous spiders known for a bite that can induce loxoscelism. They live in deserts and arid regions of the Neotropics, and females use a mixture of sand and silk when producing egg sacs. The name is Latin for assassin.

Description
Physically, they resemble crab spiders and members of the Homalonychus genus. They lack the characteristic violin-shaped marking of the more well-known members of its family, Sicariidae the recluse spiders.

They can live for a very long time without food or water. Some can live for up to fifteen years, making them among the longest-lived spiders, behind the trap-door spiders and tarantulas, many known to live for twenty to thirty years. The oldest recorded spider is Number 16, a trap-door spider killed by a parasitic wasp at forty-three years old.

Venom components and effects
Like all recluse spiders, these produce a dermonecrotic venom that contains sphingomyelinase D, an enzyme in the sphingomyelin phosphodiesterase family. It is somewhat unique to them, otherwise only found in a few pathogenic bacteria. The venom causes bleeding and damage to many organs of the body, though only S. ornatus and a few others have been proven to be extremely toxic on the order of Hexophtalma hahni or several other African sand spiders. It has also recently been proven that Sicarius thomisoides contains active sphingomyelinase D, very similar to that of Loxosceles laeta and Sicarius ornatus, and that its bite can cause serious damage in humans.

Taxonomy
This genus was erected by Charles Athanase Walckenaer in 1847 with the single species, S. thomisoides. In 2017, the number of species decreased after a phylogenetic study showed that the South African species formerly included here were actually distinct, instead belonging to the genus Hexophthalma.

It is one of only three genera in its family, and is placed in the same subfamily as Hexophthalma:

Species
 it contains twenty-one species, found in South America, Costa Rica, El Salvador, and Nicaragua:
Sicarius andinus Magalhães, Brescovit & Santos, 2017 – Peru
Sicarius boliviensis Magalhães, Brescovit & Santos, 2017 – Bolivia, Peru, Brazil, Paraguay
Sicarius cariri Magalhães, Brescovit & Santos, 2013 – Brazil
Sicarius crustosus (Nicolet, 1849) – Chile
Sicarius diadorim Magalhães, Brescovit & Santos, 2013 – Brazil
Sicarius fumosus (Nicolet, 1849) – Chile
Sicarius gracilis (Keyserling, 1880) – Ecuador, Peru
Sicarius jequitinhonha Magalhães, Brescovit & Santos, 2017 – Brazil
Sicarius lanuginosus (Nicolet, 1849) – Chile
Sicarius levii Magalhães, Brescovit & Santos, 2017 – Chile, Argentina
Sicarius mapuche Magalhães, Brescovit & Santos, 2017 – Argentina
Sicarius ornatus Magalhães, Brescovit & Santos, 2013 – Brazil
Sicarius peruensis (Keyserling, 1880) – Peru
Sicarius rugosus (F. O. Pickard-Cambridge, 1899) – El Salvador, Nicaragua, Costa Rica
Sicarius rupestris (Holmberg, 1881) – Argentina
Sicarius saci Magalhães, Brescovit & Santos, 2017 – Brazil
Sicarius thomisoides Walckenaer, 1847 (type) – Chile
Sicarius tropicus (Mello-Leitão, 1936) – Brazil
Sicarius utriformis (Butler, 1877) – Ecuador (Galapagos)
Sicarius vallenato Cala-Riquelme, Gutiérrez-Estrada, Flórez-Daza & Agnarsson, 2017 – Colombia
Sicarius yurensis Strand, 1908 – Peru, Chile

In synonymy:
S. deformis (Nicolet, 1849) = Sicarius fumosus (Nicolet, 1849)
S. irregularis (Mello-Leitão, 1940) = Sicarius rupestris (Holmberg, 1881)
S. minoratus (Nicolet, 1849) = Sicarius thomisoides Walckenaer, 1847
S. nicoleti (Keyserling, 1880) = Sicarius thomisoides Walckenaer, 1847
S. patagonicus Simon, 1919 = Sicarius rupestris (Holmberg, 1881)
S. rubripes (Nicolet, 1849) = Sicarius thomisoides Walckenaer, 1847
S. terrosus (Nicolet, 1849) = Sicarius thomisoides Walckenaer, 1847

'Transferred to Hexophthalma' Sicarius albospinosus = Hexophthalma albospinosa (Purcell, 1908)
 Sicarius damarensis = Hexophthalma damarensis (Lawrence, 1928)
 Sicarius dolichocephalus = Hexophthalma dolichocephala (Lawrence, 1928)
 Sicarius hahni = Hexophthalma hahni (Karsch, 1878) (also = Sicarius testaceus)
 Sicarius spatulatus = Hexophthalma spatulata (Pocock, 1900)

See also
 List of Sicariidae species

References

External links

 Arachnology Home Pages: Loxosceles: Recluse spiders
 Biodiversity Explorer: Family Sicariidae (photos of Sicarius and Loxosceles'')
 Platnick, N. I.  2003. World Spider Catalog.
 Vetter, R. 2003. "Causes of Necrotic Wounds other than Brown Recluse Spider Bites".
 Vetter, R. 2003. "Myth of the Brown Recluse: Fact, Fear, and Loathing".

Sicariidae
Araneomorphae genera
Spiders of Central America
Spiders of South America
Spiders of Africa
Taxa named by Charles Athanase Walckenaer